Lucky is the second extended play by South Korean girl group Weki Meki. It was released on February 21, 2018, by Fantagio Music and distributed by Interpark. It consists of six songs, including the title track "La La La".

The EP peaked at number 2 on the Gaon Album Chart. It has sold over 31,609 physical copies as of May 2018.

Background and release
On January 4, 2018, Fantagio revealed that the group's comeback was being delayed indefinitely due to "the timing of the comeback, problems with the album preparation process, and the company's internal affairs". On January 11, the group released "Butterfly" as a digital single in support of the 2018 PyeongChang Winter Olympics. On February 1, after initial reports of "indefinite delay" in their comeback plans, the group confirmed in a press release for their reality show, Weki Meki, What’s Up?, that they were preparing to release an album in late-February, continuing with their "girl crush" concept from their debut album.

On February 6, Fantagio released a schedule for their new album, revealing the name as Lucky. From February 6 to February 11, image teaser were revealed with pre-orders for the album starting on February 7. On February 12, the full track list was posted, revealing that the album will include 5 songs, including "Butterfly", previously released, and the title track "La La La". A day later, an album medley was released through the group's official YouTube channel.

The EP was released through several music portals, including MelOn in South Korea and iTunes globally.

Commercial performance 
Lucky debuted at number 2 on the Gaon Album Chart, on the chart issue dated February 18–24, 2018, marking a new peak for the group, as Weme peaked at number 7. Also, a Smart Music Card edition of the album debuted at number 31.

The album placed at number 8 for the month of February 2018, with 20,539 physical copies sold in its standard edition and at number 79 with 1,089 copies in its SMC edition. The album sold 21,628 combined sales in February. It has sold over 31,609 physical copies as of May 2018.

Track listing

Charts

References

2018 EPs
Interpark Music EPs
Korean-language EPs
Weki Meki EPs